USS New London was a screw steamer of the Union Navy during the American Civil War. She was outfitted with a Parrott rifle and 32-pounders, and was assigned as a gunboat in the Union blockade of the Confederate States of America.

Service history 

New London was built at Mystic, Connecticut in 1859, purchased by the Navy at New York City on 26 August 1861; and commissioned at New York Navy Yard on 29 October 1861, with Lieutenant Abner Read in command. Early the next morning, she took the steamboat Anna carrying turpentine and rosin from Pascagoula, Mississippi, to New Orleans, Louisiana. About dawn a week later, she took the steamboat Henry Lewis carrying sugar and molasses; and that afternoon she captured a schooner trying to slip through the blockade with naval stores for Havana, Cuba. On 28 November 1861 she captured , which was later put into service in the U.S. Navy. New London captured the steamer Advocate on 1 December; and the schooner Delight with sloops Empress and Osceola on 9 December. On the 28th the schooner Gypsy became her prize.

On 20 February 1862 a boat expedition from New London landed on Cat Island, Mississippi and interned 12 small sloops and schooners suspected of being pilot boats for blockade runners. Boats from New London captured the yachts Comet and Algerine near New Basin, Louisiana on 2 June. On 17 June she captured and destroyed batteries at North and South passes.

On 18 July, accompanied by the Grey Cloud, the New London approached the large hotel at Pascagoula and announced its arrival by firing two shells over the hotel. The New London docked at the Hotel Wharf at Pascagoula, Mississippi, and deployed about 60 sailors and marines to the village to capture mails and confiscate the telegraph equipment. Sentries quickly spotted a Confederate cavalry patrol and the sailors and marines withdrew to their gunboats. The Grey Cloud moved about a half-mile west and attempted to enter the Pascagoula River with the intent on capturing local schooners with turpentine and lumber. However, the mouth of the river was obstructed to prevent passage. At this point the gunboats stood off shore and put in three launches loaded with about 25 sailors and marines each and proceeded up the river. About a mile from the mouth, where the river is not but 200 yards wide, the launches were ambushed by a platoon of 30 troopers of the Mobile Dragoons under Lieut Hallett, a cavalry unit armed with Sharps carbines. The launches returned fire, but where in the open and withdrew to the mouth of the river with eight or nine wounded. Once the launches were clear, the New London fired 25 shells into the village and the Grey Cloud fired seven shells; however, only one civilian was reported slightly wounded. After sitting off shore 19 July, the ships withdrew from the shoreline. Ref: Charleston Daily Courier, 29 July 1862

During the ensuing years New London served on blockade duty in the Gulf of Mexico, operating primarily off the Texas coast. She and  captured the British schooner Tampico off Sabine Pass, Texas, attempting to run out laden with cotton on 3 April 1863. On the 10th, while reconnoitering near Sabine City, a boat crew from New London captured a small sloop. On 18 April, another boat expedition was surprised and driven off by Confederate troops. Three days later, while steaming to New Orleans, the ship engaged Confederate batteries at White Hall Point, Mississippi. Back off the Texas coast, she captured the schooner Raton del Nilo on 3 December.

New London continued to serve the West Gulf Blockading Squadron through the end of the Civil War. She sailed north on 12 July 1865 and decommissioned at Boston, Massachusetts, 3 August 1865. She was sold at public auction on 8 September 1865 to M. M. Comstock. Redocumented as Acushnet on 27 December 1865, she operated in merchant service until 1910.

References

Ships of the Union Navy
Ships built in Mystic, Connecticut
Steamships of the United States Navy
Gunboats of the United States Navy
American Civil War patrol vessels of the United States
1859 ships